Del Norte High School is a public high school in central northeast Albuquerque, New Mexico, established in 1964. The school is situated on a  campus (Albuquerque Public Schools District), and has an enrollment of 1,376 students.

Academics

School grade
The New Mexico Public Education Department (NMPED) replaced the federal "No Child Left Behind Act" and AYP school rating tests in 2010 with a grading algorithm that uses several testing criteria including student standardized test scores and graduation rates.

Student body statistics

Reconstruction

Construction of the new main building was completed in May, 2012. During the "A Knight to Remember" event in June, 2012, public tours of the new buildings were given by students and staff.

Athletics

DNHS competes in the New Mexico Activities Association 5A-District 2, which also includes Bernalillo High School, Capital High School, Espanola Valley High School and Los Alamos High School.

DNHS has won 11 State Championships from NMAA sanctioned sports and events:

Notable alumni
 French Stewart, actor (class of 1982)
 Darren Dalton, actor (class of 1983)
 Mark L. Donald, Navy SEAL combat corpsman, one of the most decorated heroes of the War on Terror (class of 1985)
 Diego Sanchez, NMAA Wrestling State Champion; professional mixed martial artist, Won The Ultimate Fighter 1, currently competing in the UFC's Lightweight Division
 Scott Bamforth, Professional basketball player, school's all-time leading scorer
 Lauren Sánchez, News Anchor and actress (class of 1987)
 Alisa Valdes-Rodriguez, Best selling author
 Leah Clark, voice actress affiliated with Funimation

In popular culture
Del Norte High School is mentioned in the novel Killing Mr. Griffin by Lois Duncan as the high school where the main characters go to school.

References

External links

 
 Albuquerque Public Schools

High schools in Albuquerque, New Mexico
Public high schools in New Mexico